Bernadette Brégeon-Hettich (born February 8, 1964) is a French sprint canoer who competed from the mid-1980s to the early 1990s. She was born Hettich and married the canoer Bernard Brégeon.

She won a bronze medal in the K-2 5000 m event at the 1991 ICF Canoe Sprint World Championships in Paris. Brégeon-Hettich also competed in two Summer Olympics, earning her best finish of sixth in the K-2 500 m event at Los Angeles in 1984.

She is married to fellow canoer Bernard Brégeon.

References

Sports-reference.com profile

1964 births
Canoeists at the 1984 Summer Olympics
Canoeists at the 1992 Summer Olympics
French female canoeists
Living people
People from Lunéville
Olympic canoeists of France
ICF Canoe Sprint World Championships medalists in kayak
Sportspeople from Meurthe-et-Moselle